La Tanière du Dragon ("The Lair of the Dragon") is a walk-through attraction located beneath Le Château de la Belle au Bois Dormant, at Disneyland Park in Disneyland Paris, and is unique to that park. It opened with Euro Disneyland on April 12, 1992.

Summary 
The attraction features an audio-animatronic dragon, which at 27 metres (89 ft) from head to tail, was the largest Animatronic figure ever built when the park opened in April 1992. The walkthrough consists of a dimly lit cavern with a large dragon sleeping silently. Occasionally it will 'wake up', puffing smoke and growling.

Design 
In 1987, Imagineer Terri Hardin completely headed up a project, which was surprising to her because it just didn’t happen often to women, when she worked on Dragon’s Lair in Euro Disney. She was the sole Imagineer from Walt Disney Imagineering who created it. Terri intended to have the skeleton of Maleficent’s Dragon in the lair because it was under the Sleeping Beauty Castle, but Disney didn’t go for it.

References

External links
 Official site
 Discovering the Magic Kingdom: An Unofficial Disneyland Vacation Guide - Second Edition
 Terri Hardin

Amusement rides introduced in 1992
Audio-Animatronic attractions
Disneyland Park (Paris)
Fantasyland
Walt Disney Parks and Resorts attractions
1992 establishments in France